Scrobipalpa brandti is a moth in the family Gelechiidae. It was described by Povolný in 1972. It is found in northern Iran.

The forewings range from whitish to light brownish with brownish markings. The hindwings are whitish to dirty whitish, with blackish tips.

References

Scrobipalpa
Moths described in 1972